ASME Y14.5 is a standard published by the American Society of Mechanical Engineers (ASME) to establish rules, symbols, definitions, requirements, defaults, and recommended practices for stating and interpreting Geometric Dimensions and Tolerances (GD&T). ASME/ANSI issued the first version of this Y-series standard in 1973.

Overview 
ASME Y14.5 is a complete definition of Geometric Dimensioning and Tolerancing. It contains 15 sections which cover symbols and datums as well as tolerances of form, orientation, position, profile and runout. It is complemented by ASME Y14.5.1 - Mathematical Definition of Dimensioning and Tolerancing Principles.  Together these standards allow for clear and concise detailing of dimensional requirements on a product drawing or electronic drawing package as well as the verification of the requirements on manufactured parts. Effective application of GD&T allows for parts to be verified by dimensional measurements, gauging, or by CMM.

History 
The modern standard can trace its roots to the military standard MIL-STD-8 published in 1949. It was revised by MIL-STD-8A in 1953 which introduced the concept of modern GD&T "Rule 1". Further revisions have continued to add new concepts and address new technology like Computer Aided Design and Model-based definition. A list of revisions follows:

 ASME Y14.5-2018, "Dimensioning and Tolerancing"
 Current Standard
 Preceded by ASME Y14.5-2009

 ASME Y14.5-2-2017, "Certification of Geometric Dimensioning and Tolerancing Professionals"
 Current Standard
 Preceded by ASME Y14.5-2-2000

 ASME Y14.5-2009
 Succeeded by ASME Y14.5-2018
 Preceded by ASME Y14.5M-1994

 ASME Y14.5M-1994
 Succeeded by ASME Y14.5-2009
 Reaffirmed in 2004
 Preceded by ANSI Y14.5M-1982

 ANSI Y14.5M-1982
 Preceded by ANSI Y14.5-1973
 Reaffirmed in 1988

 ANSI Y14.5-1973
 Succeeded by ASME Y14.5M-1982
 Preceded by USASI Y14.5-1966

 USASI Y14.5-1966
 Succeeded by ANSI Y14.5-1973
 Preceded by ASA Y14.5-1957

 ASA Y14.5-1957
 Succeeded by USASI Y14.5-1966
 Preceded by ASA Z14.1 Series

See also 
 Geometric dimensioning and tolerancing
 CAD standards

References

External links 
2018 | Y14.5 - Dimensioning and Tolerancing Official ASME page

American Society of Mechanical Engineers
Technical drawing
ASME standards